Arrhenia lobata is a species of agaric fungus in the family Hygrophoraceae. It is found in the Iberian Peninsula and central Europe, and North America. It associates with mosses and may have a parasitic relationship with them.

References

External links

Fungi described in 1801
Fungi of Europe
Fungi of North America
Hygrophoraceae
Taxa named by Christiaan Hendrik Persoon